Leverett Saltonstall (June 13, 1783 – May 8, 1845), was a member of the United States House of Representatives from Massachusetts who also served as Speaker of the Massachusetts House of Representatives, President of the Massachusetts Senate,  the first Mayor of Salem, Massachusetts and a Member of the Board of Overseers of Harvard College.

Saltonstall was a great-grandfather of Massachusetts Governor and U.S. Senator Leverett Saltonstall (1892-1979).

Early life and education
Saltonstall was born in Haverhill, Massachusetts, June 13, 1783 as a member of the Saltonstall family. He pursued classical studies, attending Phillips Exeter Academy, Exeter, New Hampshire, and was graduated from Harvard University in 1802. He studied law, and was admitted to the bar association and commenced practice in Salem, Massachusetts, in 1805.

Salem City Hall & Mayor Leverett Saltonstall
Salem City Hall was built in 1837-38 under the supervision of Mayor Leverett Saltonstall and a committee appointed for that purpose. The cornerstone was laid on September 6, 1837. Artifacts buried beneath the cornerstone included copies of local newspapers, the Mayor's speech for the organization of City Government (May 9, 1836), and the new City Charter.

Estate of Simon Forrester
Saltonstall, his brother-in-law Dudley Leavitt Pickman and Nathaniel Bowditch all acted as trustees of the estate of Simon Forrester, a ship captain born in Ireland who became one of pioneers of Salem merchant shipping and one of Salem's leading merchants and philanthropists.

Positions and offices
A delegate to the Massachusetts Constitutional Convention in 1820.
An unsuccessful candidate for election to the 17th United States Congress in 1820.
A member of the Massachusetts House of Representatives in 1813, 1814, 1816, 1822, 1829, 1834, and 1844.
Served in the Massachusetts Senate, 1817–1819, 1831, and 1832, and was President of the Massachusetts Senate in 1831 and 1832.
Elected a Fellow of the American Academy of Arts and Sciences in 1824.
The first mayor of Salem, serving 1836–1837.
Elected as a Whig to the 25th United States Congress to fill the vacancy caused by the resignation of Stephen C. Phillips, and then reelected to the Twenty-sixth and Twenty-seventh Congresses, serving from December 5, 1838, to March 3, 1843.
Chairman for the Committee on Expenditures in the Department of the Navy (Twenty-sixth Congress).
Committee on Manufactures (Twenty-seventh Congress).
Unsuccessful candidate for reelection to the Twenty-eighth Congress.
Overseer of Harvard University, 1835–1845.

Death and burial
Leverett Saltonstall died in Salem, Essex County, Massachusetts, May 8, 1845, and rests in Harmony Grove Cemetery.

References

Bibliography
 

Massachusetts state senators
Phillips Exeter Academy alumni
Fellows of the American Academy of Arts and Sciences
Harvard University alumni
Members of the Massachusetts House of Representatives
Politicians from Haverhill, Massachusetts
Mayors of Salem, Massachusetts
1783 births
1845 deaths
Whig Party members of the United States House of Representatives from Massachusetts
19th-century American politicians
Burials at Harmony Grove Cemetery